Sultan Hamud is a town in Kasikeu division of Makueni County, Kenya. It was previously in the former Nzaui District of Eastern Province.

The town is part of Nzai County Council and Kilome Constituency.

Transport 
Sultan Hamud lies on the main railway line of Kenya Railways between the coast at Mombasa and the national capital of Nairobi.  It is also a junction for a short branch line.

See also 
 Railway stations in Kenya

References

External links 

Populated places in Eastern Province (Kenya)
Makueni County